In electromagnetism, current sources and sinks are analysis formalisms which distinguish points, areas, or volumes through which electric current enters or exits a system. While current sources or sinks are abstract elements used for analysis, generally they have physical counterparts in real-world applications; e.g. the anode or cathode in a battery. In all cases, each of the opposing terms (source or sink) may refer to the same object, depending on the perspective of the observer and the sign convention being used; there is no intrinsic difference between a source and a sink.

Current sources and sinks in neurobiology

Current sources and sinks have proven to be very valuable in the study of brain function. Both have particular relevance in electrophysiology. Two examples of the study of sources and sinks are electroencephalography (EEG) and current source density analysis (extracellular field potentials), but have also shown enhancements in spatio-temporal resolution of EEG.

Current source density analysis
Current source density analysis (which could more accurately be called current source and sink density analysis) is the practice of placing a microelectrode in proximity to a nerve or a nerve cell to detect current sourcing from, or sinking into, their plasma membranes.  When positive charges, for example, flow quickly across a plasma membrane to the inside of a cell (sink) this creates a transient cloud of negativity in the vicinity of the sink.  This is because the flow of positive charges into the interior of the cell leaves behind uncompensated negative charges.  A nearby micro-electrode with substantial tip resistance (on the order of 1 MΩ) can detect that negativity because a voltage difference will develop across the tip of the electrode (between the negativity outside the electrode, and the electroneutral environment inside the electrode).  Put another way, the electrode internal solution will donate some of the positive charge needed to compensate the negativity caused by the current sink.  Thus, the inside of the electrode will become negative relative to ground for as long as the extracellular negativity persists.  The extracellular negativity will persist as long as the current sink is present.  Thus, by measuring a negativity relative to ground, the electrode indirectly reports the presence of a nearby current sink.  The size of the recorded negativity will vary directly with the size of the current sink and inversely with the distance between the electrode and the sink.

The relationship between the sum of the current sources and sinks and the voltage measured by the microelectrode probe may be calculated analytically if it is assumed that the quasi-static assumption holds, that the medium is spherically symmetric, homogeneous, isotropic, and infinite, and if the current source or sink is modeled as a point source. The relationship is given by:

where  is the potential at radius  from the source or sink, which passes current  through a medium with conductivity .

See also 
Current source
Current mirror

References 

Electrical systems
Electromagnetism